Glenn Sarty (September 9, 1930 – February 6, 2007) was a Canadian television producer who was involved in such shows as Take Thirty, The Fifth Estate and Adrienne at Large.

Sarty was involved in the creation of the CBC's Academy Award-winning The Fifth Estate.

Sarty died in his Cape Cod home in 2007 of emphysema.

References

External links
 
 Glenn Sarty fonds (R12605) at Library and Archives Canada

1930 births
2007 deaths
Canadian television producers
Deaths from emphysema